The 2005 Golden Corral 500 was a NASCAR Nextel Cup Series race held on March 20, 2005, at Atlanta Motor Speedway, in Hampton, Georgia. Contested at 325 laps on the 1.54 mile (2.48 km) speedway, it was the 4th race of the 2005 NASCAR Nextel Cup Series season. Carl Edwards of Roush Racing won the race, the first of his career.

Background
Atlanta Motor Speedway (formerly Atlanta International Raceway) is a track in Hampton, Georgia, 20 miles (32 km) south of Atlanta. It is a  quad-oval track with a seating capacity of 111,000. It opened in 1960 as a  standard oval. In 1994, 46 condominiums were built over the northeastern side of the track. In 1997, to standardize the track with Speedway Motorsports' other two  ovals, the entire track was almost completely rebuilt. The frontstretch and backstretch were swapped, and the configuration of the track was changed from oval to quad-oval. The project made the track one of the fastest on the NASCAR circuit.

Entry list

Qualifying

Race recap
The first caution did not take long as it came out on lap 1 out of turn 2 which was the big one collecting 10 cars. Casey Mears got into Mike Bliss out of turn 2 causing Mears to spin to the left. Mears then overcorrected his car back to the right, right in front of a whole pack of cars causing others to check up and run into each other. The cars involved were Mears, Shane Hmiel, Robby Gordon, Scott Riggs, Matt Kenseth, Bobby Labonte, Jeff Gordon, Jeff Burton, Travis Kvapil, and Kurt Busch. A red flag was issued to clean up the mess. Pole-sitter Ryan Newman led the first lap under caution. On the restart on lap 6, Newman soon lost the lead to Jimmie Johnson. On lap 62, Greg Biffle took the lead from Jimmie Johnson. After the longest green flag run of 80 laps, the second caution came out on lap 85 for debris. On lap 91, Biffle gave up the lead to Johnson. On lap 117, the third caution came out when Mike Wallace blew an engine. Biffle won the race off of pit road and was the race leader. Johnson soon took the lead on the restart but Biffle took it back 10 laps later. On lap 159, the fourth caution flew when Kurt Busch blew a right front tire and hit the wall in turn 2. On the restart, Biffle and Johnson continued to swap the lead back and forth from each other. On lap 202, the 5th caution flew when Bobby Hamilton Jr. blew a right front tire and hit the wall in turn 2. On the restart, Johnson and Biffle continued to battle for the lead but Johnson won the battle with Biffle after they swapped the lead about 3 different times from each other. A majority of people thought that it was gonna be a spectacular finish between Biffle and Johnson towards the end of the race. On lap 233, the 6th caution came out for debris. On the race off of pit road, Biffle was the leader of the race and never gave up the lead to Johnson on the restart. With 47 laps to go, the 7th caution came out when Kyle Petty's engine let go. On the race off of pit road, Jimmie Johnson was the new race leader. With 31 to go, Robby Gordon's engine blew bringing out the 8th and final caution. Carl Edwards won the
race off of pit road and was the leader on the restart. But Jimmie Johnson took the lead from Edwards and it looked like Johnson was gonna win. But Edwards was not gonna give up easily to Johnson and began closing in on Jimmie in the closing laps even with the most dominant car at that point in Greg Biffle right behind Edwards. But Edwards pulled away from Biffle and closed in on Johnson with 2 to go. On the final lap, Edwards attempted to pass Johnson on the outside in turns 1 and 2 but failed to do so. Edwards tried again in turns 3 and 4 and was able to make it stick. The two touched twice down the front stretch and Edwards just beat Johnson by .028 seconds for the first win of his Cup Series career. Johnson, Biffle, Mark Martin, and Kasey Kahne rounded out the top 5 while Brian Vickers, Michael Waltrip, Dave Blaney, Scott Riggs, and Elliott Sadler rounded out the top 10. Greg Biffle and Jimmie Johnson were the 2 most dominant cars of the race but both failed to score the win. The two led a combined 307 of the 325 laps with Johnson leading 5 more laps then Biffle with Johnson leading 156 and Biffle leading 151. The two also swapped the lead from each other 11 times that day.

Results

Race Statistics
 Time of race: 3:29:18
 Average Speed: 
 Pole Speed: 
 Cautions: 8 for 40 laps
 Margin of Victory: 0.028 sec
 Lead changes: 27
 Percent of race run under caution: 12.3%         
 Average green flag run: 31.7 laps

References

Golden Corral 500
NASCAR races at Atlanta Motor Speedway
2005 in sports in Georgia (U.S. state)